Paniahwa railway station is a railway station on Muzaffarpur–Gorakhpur main line under the Varanasi railway division of North Eastern Railway zone. This is situated beside Khadda-Chhitauni Road at Malhia in Kushinagar district of the Indian state of Uttar Pradesh.

References

Railway stations in Kushinagar district
Varanasi railway division